A notchback is a design of a car with the rearmost section that is distinct from the passenger compartment and where the back of the passenger compartment is at an angle to the top of what is typically the rear baggage compartment. Notchback cars have "a trunk whose lid forms a distinct deck." In profile view, the body has a step down from the roof with a downward inclined passenger compartment's rear window to meet an almost horizontal trunk lid extending to the rear of the car. 

The category may be characterized as having a three-box design where the trunk volume is less pronounced than the engine and passenger compartments. 

Many models of sedans, coupés, or hatchbacks could be classified as notchbacks. However, the category has limited salience outside of American car manufacturers distinguishing the three-box models from other body styles in the same model range. For example, the Chevrolet Vega range included both a notchback coupe and a fastback coupe.

North America
One of the first cars marketed as a notchback is the 1938 Cadillac Sixty Special.

In 1952, a notchback version of the Nash Ambassador was introduced.

In 1971, Chevrolet marketed the three-box sedan models of the Chevrolet Vega as a notchback to differentiate them from the fastback Vega models. For the 1973 model year, the car's name was changed to "Vega Notchback".

English-speaking countries 
While many car models have notchback characteristics, the category is largely unused outside of North America, with their body style being described using other terms. For example, a three-box sedan is more generally known as a "saloon" in British English. "Notchback" has appeared in a few British English publications, however, it is not a term that is used in common parlance in Britain.

See also 
 Car body style
 Ponton Styling

References 

Automotive styling features

de:Fahrzeugheck#Stufenheck
es:Carrocería#Notchback